Banzkow is a former Amt in the Ludwigslust-Parchim district, in Mecklenburg-Vorpommern, Germany. The seat of the Amt was in Banzkow. It was disbanded on 1 January 2014, when its members joined the Amt Crivitz.

The Amt Banzkow consisted of the following municipalities:
Banzkow
Plate
Sukow

Former Ämter in Mecklenburg-Western Pomerania